The 2011 Vietnamese Cup was the 19th edition of the Vietnamese Cup. It started on 8 January 2011 and finished on 27 August 2011.

The cup winner were guaranteed a place in the 2012 AFC Cup.

First round

Byes: Bình Dương, Đà Nẵng, Hà Nội T&T, Hoàng Anh Gia Lai, Nam Định, Sông Lam Nghệ An

Second round

Quarterfinals

Semifinals

Final

References 
 Soccerway

Vietnamese National Cup
Cup